Luboš Rob (born April 18, 1995) is a Czech ice hockey player. His father Luboš Rob senior (born 1970) is also a Czech professional ice hockey player and was drafted by the New York Rangers in the fifth round of the 1990 NHL Draft.

He is currently playing with VHK Vsetín of the Czech Chance ligy.

Rob made his Czech Extraliga debut playing with HC České Budějovice during the 2012–13 Czech Extraliga season.

References

External links

1995 births
Living people
Czech ice hockey forwards
Motor České Budějovice players
Sportspeople from České Budějovice